Dishyum is a 2006 Indian Tamil-language action-romance film directed by Sasi. Cinematography by Santonio Terzio. The film stars Jiiva, Sandhya, Guinness Pakru, Nassar, and Malavika Avinash. The film's score and soundtrack are composed by Vijay Antony of Sukran fame. The film was released on 2 February 2006, receiving positive reviews from critics.

Plot

Bhaskar, a stuntman, is smitten with Cinthya, a college student. However, his heart is broken when he learns that she doesn't love him back, but he still to tries persuade her.

Cast

Production
The producers of the film had initially signed Pooja to play the lead role in January 2004, before Sandhya replaced her. Before Jiiva was brought onboard, the film was shot for eleven/twelve days with actor Ashok. Vijay Sethupathi played a police officer in the initial version, which was later scrapped. Jiiva, who had previously trained in Kung fu for three years, underwent gymnastics training for his role as a stuntman. He performed some of the stunts himself, and was accompanied by stunt directors all the time. He further revealed stuntmen were the first to see the film.

Soundtrack

The music was composed by Vijay Antony receiving good reviews. The song "Dailamo Dailamo" was reused in Mahatma (2009).

Reception
Nowrunning.com review said that "it is an absorbing story telling with minimum fuss for the youth" and gave it 3/5.
Indiaglitz.com review said that "is a feel-good movie for youngsters".
Sify.com gave a verdict that the film is "enjoyable".

References

External links

 

2006 films
Indian romantic action films
2000s Tamil-language films
Films about stunt performers
Films scored by Vijay Antony
Films directed by Sasi (director)